Anett Schutting (born 24 August 1991 in Tallinn) is an Estonian former tennis player. On 25 October 2010, she reached her best singles ranking of world No. 592. On 18 July 2011, she peaked at No. 562 in the doubles rankings.

Schutting has a 3–7 record for Estonia in Fed Cup competition.

ITF finals

Singles (0–1)

Doubles (0–1)

Fed Cup participation

Singles

Doubles

References

External links 
 
 
 

1991 births
Living people
Sportspeople from Tallinn
Estonian female tennis players
California Golden Bears women's tennis players